South Carolina Highway 223 (SC 223) is a  primary state highway in the U.S. state of South Carolina. It serves as a connector between Richburg and Landsford Canal State Park.

Route description

SC 223 is a two-lane rural highway that traverses from SC 9 and SC 901 north of Richburg to U.S. Route 21 (US 21) in the community of Landsford and Landsford Canal State Park.

History

The first SC 223 appeared from 1939-1940 as a spur off SC 22, renumbered as an extension of SC 901.

The current SC 223 was established in 1940, connecting Richburg with US 21. In 1948, it was briefly downgraded as a secondary road, but was resurrected a year later after the road was fully paved; changed little since.

Major intersections

See also

References

External links

SC 223 at Virginia Highways' South Carolina Highways Annex

Transportation in Chester County, South Carolina
223